Emil R. Buchser High School was a public high school in Santa Clara, California. It graduated its first class in 1960 and changed its name in 1981 to, Santa Clara High School, which was around many years at a much older location before Buchser High's campus. Santa Clara High's previous campus became the home of the new Buchser Middle School.  The science wing at Buchser Middle School caught fire in 2004, but has been rebuilt since then.

Notable alumni
 Steve Bartkowski, NFL quarterback who played for the Atlanta Falcons (1975–1985) and the Los Angeles Rams (1986) was a 1971 graduate of Buchser High.  An All-American QB at University of California, Berkeley, he was the 1st overall pick in the 1975 NFL Draft, even ahead of the great Walter Payton.
 Joe Charboneau the colorful Major League Baseball player for the Cleveland Indians attended Buchser High.  He was the American League Rookie of the Year in 1980 while playing for the Cleveland Indians.
 Mark Langston, Pitcher who played Major League Baseball from 1984 to 1999, is a Buchser High alumnus.  He started his career with the Seattle Mariners, but spent most of his MLB career with the California Angels.  He was selected four times as an All-Star pitcher, in 1987, 1991, 1992, and in 1993.
 Omid Kordestani, businessman, who has been the Executive Chairman at Twitter since October 2015. He was previously a Senior Vice President and the Chief Business Officer at Google, where he worked from May 1999 to April 2009, as well as being a special advisor to the CEO and founders at Google during July 2014 to October 2015.

High school information 
Buchser High School's mascot was a "Bruin" bear.  The school's colors were scarlet red, black, and white.
Buchser High has an active alumni Web site at www.buchserhigh.org, where alumni can get information on anything related to the high school and its alumni.
Buchser High alumni gather annually for a reunion picnic at Central Park in Santa Clara, California.  It is held in late August on a weekend and all Bruin alumni from all classes are invited.  Full information on the reunion picnic is available at www.buchserhigh.org.
Krazy George Henderson, the renowned wacky cheerleader for many college and professional  teams, got his start while teaching at Buchser High in 1975.
Donald Callejon was the longest-serving Principal at Buchser High and has long been considered its "heart and soul".
The first Vice-Principal and Dean of Boys was Robert "Stormy" Hileman who also served from the start date in 1958 to 1964.

References 

High schools in Santa Clara County, California
Defunct schools in California
Educational institutions disestablished in 1981
1959 establishments in California